Jonathan Lyndon Chase (born 1989, Philadelphia, PA) is an American visual artist. Chase's paintings and drawings focus primarily on queer black bodies in mundane, everyday spaces. Chase lives and works in Philadelphia, Pennsylvania.

Early life and education 
Chase was born in Philadelphia, Pennsylvania in 1989.

Chase graduated from University of the Arts, Philadelphia, Pennsylvania in 2013 and went on to receive a Master in Fine Arts at the Pennsylvania Academy of the Fine Arts, Philadelphia, Pennsylvania in 2016.

Work 
Chase's practice is a process of traditional and digital collage, drawing, photography, poetry, archiving, and research.

Chases's figurative paintings stand stylistically beside peers Louis Fratino, Nicole Eisenman, and Carroll Dunham, and equally reference the erotic woodblock prints of Ukiyo-e. Artist and curator Tiona Nekkia McClodden writes of Chase's paintings, "The figures mirror each other, touch each other …  reach through each other. They are layered, they are tender and have a necessary roughness. Lovemaking, or rather loving oneself is like this. There is the way he allows a reversed negative x-ray transparency to look through certain parts of the body."

Art critic Holland Cotter notes of the exhibition, "Quiet Storm” — which refers to a genre of mellow, primarily African-American pop music — there is nothing the least quiet about Mr. Chase's exuberant brushwork, or his images of glittered-splashed flesh and gay coupledom." Writer Miss Rosen says of Chase, "Imagine the love child of Missy Elliott and Romare Bearden, raised by Ren & Stimpy, and embracing the intimacies of James Baldwin's Giovanni's Room … and you can begin to grasp the intricate complexities and exquisite nuances of African-American artist Jonathan Lyndon Chase."

Chase notes artists Romare Bearden, Alison Saar, Marlon Riggs, Robert Colescott, Alice Neel, and Kerry James Marshall as key inspirations as well as culture and fashion from the 1980s and 1990s, Afrofuturism, and science-fiction in relationship to black and queer narratives.

Exhibitions 
Solo exhibitions

 Sheets, Kohn Gallery, Los Angeles, CA, 2018
 Quiet Storm, Company Gallery, New York , NY, 2018
 Sweet and Hard, Thierry Goldberg Gallery, New York, NY, 2016
 Rosebud, Lord Ludd, Philadelphia, PA, 2016
 Arenas, Tenderness, and Gloom, Gallery 817, University of the Arts, Philadelphia, PA, 2015
 Double Identity, University of the Arts, Philadelphia, PA, 2013

Selected group exhibitions

 Punch, curated by Nina Chanel Abney, Deitch Projects, New York, NY, 2018
 Reclamation! Pan-African Works from the Beth Rudin DeWoody Collection, The Taubman, 2018
 Museum of Art, Roanoke, VA, 2018
 Engender, curated by Joshua Friedman, Kohn Gallery, Los Angeles, CA, 2017
 “NUDE”V1, Gallery Denmark, Copenhagen, 2017
 Black Masculinity, PafA Historic Landmark Building, 2017
 Life and Living, Deli Gallery, Long Island City, NY, 2017
 Discovery, Art Brussels, Belgium, 2017
 Chase | Frantino | Lee, Thierry Goldberg Gallery, New York, NY, 2017
 Tie his hands gently, ROMEO Gallery, New York, NY, 2016
 Person, Place or Thing, Fleisher/Ollman Gallery, Philadelphia, PA, 2016

Bibliography 

 SHEETS (Kohn Gallery, 2018) OCLC 1055562132
 Quiet storm (Capricious, 2018) OCLC
Young Gifted and Black- A New Generation of Artist-  Antwaun Sargent (D.A.P, 2020)

Talks 

 Painting and Representation with Tim Doud and Louis Fratino at the National Gallery of Art, Washington, D.C., October 21, 2018

References 

American artists
1989 births
Living people
American LGBT artists
Queer artists